Cuspidariidae is a family of small marine bivalve molluscs in the superfamily Cuspidarioidea.

Genera and species
Genera and species in the family Cuspidariidae:
 Austroneaera Powell, 1937
 Austroneaera brevirostris Powell, 1937
 Austroneaera finlayi Powell, 1937
 Cardiomya A. Adams, 1864
 Cardiomya alcocki (Smith, 1884)
 Cardiomya bruuni Dell, 1956 
 Cardiomya cleryana (d'Orbigny, 1846)
 Cardiomya rectimarginata Dell, 1962  
 Cuspidaria Nardo, 1840
 Halonympha Dall & Smith, 1886
 Myonera Dall & Smith, 1886
 Neaera Gray in Griffith & Pidgeon, 1834 
 Plectodon
 Plectodon ligulus (Yokoyama, 1922)
 Protocuspidaria Allen & Morgan, 1981
 Pseudoneaera
 Pseudoneaera semipellucida (Kuroda, 1948)
 Pseudoneaera wellmani (Fleming, 1948)
 Rhinoclama Dall & Smith, 1886
 Tropidomya Dall & Smith, 1886

References

 Powell A. W. B., New Zealand Mollusca, William Collins Publishers Ltd, Auckland, New Zealand 1979 

 
Bivalve families